Eugenie Ruth Lumbers  (also known as Eugenie Forbes) is an Australian medical researcher whose work has focused on the role of the renin-angiotensin system in fetal development and in women's health.

Career 
She earned her MBBS medical degrees and her MD doctorate from the University of Adelaide.  She was the first woman to be awarded a CJ Martin Fellowship by the National Health and Medical Research Council of Australia, and with that funding she studied fetal physiology at Oxford University. In 1974 she joined the faculty of University of New South Wales (UNSW). She was awarded the degree of DSc in 1986 and became the first woman appointed as a Scientia Professor at UNSW in 1999. She was elected as Fellow to the Australian Academy of Science and received the Centenary Medal in 2002. In 2010, she was elected a Fellow of the Royal Society of New South Wales. In 2012, she was appointed a Member of the Order of Australia. She received a joint appointment at University of Queensland in 2009 and held that until 2011. She left UNSW in 2013 and received an appointment as a professor at University of Newcastle.

Along with Brian Morris she discovered prorenin, (the protein precursor of renin); her initial findings were met with disbelief from the field, when she began working on it during her doctoral studies.   She has studied whether gene therapy could be a viable way to treat congenital diseases during fetal development, and has studied whether drugs that modulate the renin-angiotensis system could be useful to treat endometrial cancer.

Selected publications
Five most-cited papers as of August 2018:

References

Australian biologists
Living people
Members of the Order of Australia
Recipients of the Centenary Medal
University of Adelaide alumni
Academic staff of the University of Newcastle (Australia)
Academic staff of the University of New South Wales
Year of birth missing (living people)
Fellows of the Australian Academy of Science
Fellows of the Royal Society of New South Wales